The  WDSF European Formation Latin Championship is the main annual formation International Latin dancesport championship in Europe.

Summary of championships

References

External links 
2013 Vilnius
WDSF

Dancesport competitions
European championships
Latin dances